Planina Cave, formerly also Little Castle Cave after Little Castle in the vicinity of its entrance, is one of the longest Slovenian active caves. It is a huge tunnel and the subterranean bed of the Unica River. It is located in Inner Carniola. Five hundred meters from the entrance into the cave is a confluence of two underground rivers: the Pivka River, flowing from the Postojna Polje through Postojna Cave, and the Rak River, flowing to Planina Cave through Weaver Cave from Rak Škocjan. This is one of the largest confluences of subterranean rivers in Europe.

Entrance into the cave is at the southwestern part of Planina Polje in the gable end valley below 65 high rocks. It has been shown by water tracing that there is a connection between the systems of Planina Cave and Postojna Cave, and the administration of Postojna Cave estimates the connection will also be explored by cavers.

Geographical data
latitude: 45°49'12" N (WGS 84)
longitude: 14°14'45" E
elevation: 
length of the cave: 
subterranean depth:

Gallery

References

External links
 
 Planinska jama: lokacije s prostorskimi slikami. [Planina Cave: Locations with Surround Photography]. Burger.si. Boštjan Burger. (Viewable with FlashPlayer). Retrieved 19 February 2012.

Limestone caves
Caves of Inner Carniola
Show caves in Slovenia
Postojna Cave
Municipality of Postojna
Articles containing video clips